Philip Whitticase (born 15 March 1965) is a former wicket-keeper and later head coach at Leicestershire County Cricket Club. After 31 years at the club, he left at the end of 2014. He has since worked for the England and Wales Cricket Board as a cricket liaison officer. In January 2020, he was named as one of the three match referees for the 2020 Under-19 Cricket World Cup tournament in South Africa.

References

External links
Philip Whitticase at CricketArchive

English cricketers
Leicestershire cricketers
English cricket coaches
1965 births
Living people
Wicket-keepers